Five Sisters is a historic neighborhood in the South End of Burlington, Vermont. There are approximately 300 homes on the neighborhood's five streets which were completed in the late 19th and early 20th century. According to local legend, these streets were named after the developer's five daughters, though local historians can neither confirm nor deny such rumors.

In 2006, the Five Sisters neighborhood was named to the "top ten" neighborhoods in the United States by Cottage Living magazine.

The Five Sisters
Caroline St.
Catherine St.
Charlotte St.
Margaret St.
Marion St.

Sources
Seven-Days article on the Five Sisters
Cottage Living magazine

Geography of Burlington, Vermont